Where Were You may refer to:
"Where Were You (When the World Stopped Turning)", a 2001 single by Alan Jackson
"Where Were You", a 2013 single by The Mend (group)
Where Were You?, 1990 album by Joey DeFrancesco and its title track
"Where Were You", a song by Bonnie Tyler from the 1991 album Bitterblue
"Where Were You", a song by Clay Walker from the 1995 album Hypnotize the Moon
"Where Were You", a song by Tired Lion from the 2017 album Dumb Days
"Ships (Where Were You)", a 1991 single by Big Country